Shi Yue (born 17 April 1999) is a Chinese fencer. She won the gold medal in the women's individual foil event at the 2022 Asian Fencing Championships held in Seoul, South Korea.

She competed in the women's foil event at the World Fencing Championships in 2018 and 2019 and in both competitions she was eliminated in her first match.

In 2018, she won the silver medal in the women's team foil event at the Asian Games held in Jakarta, Indonesia. She won one of the bronze medals in the women's team foil event at the 2019 Asian Fencing Championships held in Chiba, Japan.

References

External links 
 

Living people
1999 births
Place of birth missing (living people)
Chinese female foil fencers
Chinese female fencers
Asian Games silver medalists for China
Asian Games medalists in fencing
Fencers at the 2018 Asian Games
Medalists at the 2018 Asian Games
21st-century Chinese women